"Analyse" is a song by Irish rock band the Cranberries. It was the first single released from their fifth studio album, Wake Up and Smell the Coffee (2001), on 27 August 2001. The promotional video, directed by Keir McFarlane, had to be edited in consequence of the 9/11 attacks, which was partly responsible for the single's low chart positions in their native Ireland (number 28, their eleventh and last top-40 hit there) and the United Kingdom (number 89, their first single to miss the top 40 since "Animal Instinct"), but it became a top-10 hit in Italy, Portugal, and Spain.

Remixes and other releases
Music producer Marius de Vries was commissioned to remix "Analyse". The remix, which is called the "Oceanic remix", is a chill-out version of the original song with light electronica elements and piano additions. While an edited version was made available on some commercial singles, the long version was released only on promotional CDs. Previously, the Cranberries also released an airy and distorted mix of Zombie, called "Camel's Hump Mix", on the "When You're Gone" single and some slightly different mixes of "How" ("Linger" single) and "Pretty" (Prêt-à-Porter soundtrack). De Vries also remixed the band's next single, "Time Is Ticking Out".

Acoustic versions of "Analyse" were released on two US radio compilations. The first one, featured on KBCO Studio C, Volume 13, was recorded at the Boulder-based radio station KBCO on 16 August 2001, while the second one was recorded at Studio C of the Minneapolis-based radio station KTCZ-FM on 20 August 2001 and featured on the Cities 97 Sampler Volume 13.

The studio version "Analyse" was to be released on the Sweet November soundtrack, but was ultimately not included due to the timing of the album release. The song was used in the 2002 ABC pilot, Nancy Drew.

Music video
A promotion video, directed by Keir McFarlane, was planned to be released in September 2001. The original video, which pictured O'Riordan performing atop a building as a plane flew over two skyscrapers, was recalled from media after having been sent to the world's major video networks before the 9/11 attacks in New York. An edited version, where all airplane images were erased, was sent back to media on 1 October 2001. Both versions of the video are featured on the Stars: The Best of Videos 1992–2002 DVD.

Track listings

UK CD single
 "Analyse" (album radio edit)	
 "Analyse" (Oceanic radio edit)
 "I Can't Be with You" (live at Vicar Street, Dublin, 11 November 2000)

European CD single
 "Analyse" (LP version) – 4:14
 "Wanted" (Live in Paris) – 1:57	

European and Australian maxi-CD single
 "Analyse" (radio edit)
 "Analyse" (Oceanic radio edit)
 "I Can't Be with You" (live at Vicar Street, Dublin, 11 November 2000)
 "In the Ghetto" (live at Vicar Street, Dublin, 11 November 2000)

Charts

Release history

References

2001 singles
2001 songs
The Cranberries songs
MCA Records singles
Music videos directed by Keir McFarlane
Song recordings produced by Stephen Street
Songs written by Dolores O'Riordan